Deborah Edwards (born 25 September 1978) is an Australian hurdler. She competed in the women's 100 metres hurdles at the 2000 Summer Olympics.

References

External links
 

1978 births
Living people
Athletes (track and field) at the 2000 Summer Olympics
Australian female hurdlers
Olympic athletes of Australia
Place of birth missing (living people)